Ryoki Inoue (born José Carlos Ryoki de Alpoim Inoue; 22 July 1946) is a Brazilian writer of both Japanese and Portuguese descent, acknowledged by the Guinness World Records as the world's most prolific writer. Since he began his career in 1986, he had 1075 books published, under his own name or 39 pseudonyms.

References

External links
 Ryoki Inoue

1946 births
Living people
Brazilian people of Japanese descent
Brazilian people of Portuguese descent
20th-century Brazilian male writers
20th-century Brazilian writers
21st-century Brazilian writers